Claudinei Alexandre Pires, or simply Dinei (born 10 September 1971 in São Paulo), is a former striker who played for several Brazilian football clubs.

Playing for Corinthians, he made club history as the only player to win three Brazilian championships in 1990, 1998, 1999.

Honours 
Corinthians
 Campeonato Brasileiro Série A: 1990, 1998, 1999
 FIFA Club World Championship: 2000
 Copa do Brasil: 2002
 Supercopa do Brasil: 1991
 Campeonato Paulista: 1999

Internacional
 Campeonato Gaúcho: 1994

 Cruzeiro
 Copa de Oro: 1995
 Campeonato Mineiro: 1996

Realitys Show 
 A Fazenda 4
 A Fazenda 9
 Ilha Record 1
 Power Couple (Brazilian season 6)

External links

References 

1971 births
Living people
Brazilian footballers
Brazilian expatriate footballers
Brazilian expatriate sportspeople in Switzerland
Association football forwards
Expatriate footballers in Switzerland
The Farm (TV series) contestants
Campeonato Brasileiro Série A players
Sport Club Corinthians Paulista players
Guarani FC players
Grasshopper Club Zürich players
Associação Portuguesa de Desportos players
Sport Club Internacional players
Cruzeiro Esporte Clube players
Coritiba Foot Ball Club players
Associação Atlética Internacional (Limeira) players
Esporte Clube Santo André players
Associação Atlética Portuguesa (Santos) players
Footballers from São Paulo